Mafeking Park is a public park in Morpeth, Northumberland, England at the bottom of Station Bank. It was unsuccessfully put forward by locals to be listed as the smallest park in the world in the Guinness Book of Records. The park was originally a triangle of land bounded by roads but after road improvements is now a small roundabout. Recently, the area around the roundabout has been subject to improvements, including the installation of off and on road cycle routes.

References 

Parks and open spaces in Northumberland
Morpeth, Northumberland